Själevads IK is a sports club from Själevad, 5 kilometres west of Örnsköldsvik, Sweden. The women's soccer season of 2004 was the first in the Swedish top division, Damallsvenskan, for the club, which qualified for yet another season. before being relegated in 2005.

Själevads IK play their home games at Själevads IP Stadium in Själevad. The team colours are green and white.

The club has previously been active in other sports too, such as bandy, ice hockey, and orienteering.

References

External links
 Själevads IK 

1923 establishments in Sweden
Sport in Västernorrland County
Association football clubs established in 1923
Bandy clubs established in 1923
Ice hockey clubs established in 1923
Women's football clubs in Sweden
Defunct bandy clubs in Sweden